Sarah Gilman  (born January 18, 1996) is an American actress, known for her role as Delia in the Disney Channel series I Didn't Do It.

Life and career 
Was born on January 18, 1996, and resides in Los Angeles. Her first acting jobs were in theatre. She played main roles in musicals like Narnia, You're a Good Man, Charlie Brown and Alice. In 2011, she made her film debut in the short movie Hold for Laughs. She played the lead role as Margaret, a 13-year-old girl who is bullied at a Catholic school. She later guest starred in the TV series Up All Night and Marvin Marvin. Since 2012 she has had a recurring role as Cammy, Eve's best friend in the sitcom Last Man Standing. On June 18, 2013, it was announced that Gilman would play a main role as Delia Delfano in the Disney Channel sitcom I Didn't Do It. The show ended on October 16, 2015.

Gilman graduated with honors from Flintridge Preparatory School where she also achieved the Advanced Placement Scholar designation. She is athletic and played in a variety of school sports teams including volleyball, water polo, basketball, softball and soccer. She was the only girl in school history to complete the intense training required to play on the Boys Junior Varsity Football team. On June 1, 2014, she graduated from high school.  Gilman began attending the University of Southern California in the fall of 2014.  She is studying film production, screenwriting, and theatre. She graduated with a Bachelor of Arts degree in 2019.

Filmography

References 

1996 births
Actresses from Los Angeles
American child actresses
American film actresses
American television actresses
Living people
21st-century American actresses
USC School of Cinematic Arts alumni

External links